Redemption is the third studio album by American rapper Jay Rock. It was released by Top Dawg Entertainment (TDE) and Interscope Records on June 15, 2018. The album, which serves as Rock's major-label debut, succeeds his second album 90059 (2015), released three years prior. 

The album includes production from a variety of record producers, including Sounwave, Hit-Boy, Mike Will Made It, Boi-1da and TDE label-head Anthony "Top Dawg" Tiffith, who also serves as executive producer. Further production contributions came from Jake One, Teddy Walton, Cardo and Vinylz, among others. The album features Rock's TDE label-mates Kendrick Lamar, SZA, and Sir, as well as guest appearances from Dcmbr, Future, Tee Grizzley, J. Cole, Jeremih, and Mozzy.

It was supported by the lead single "King's Dead", with Kendrick Lamar, Future and James Blake, followed by singles "Win" and "The Bloodiest". The album was met with critical acclaim and debuted at number 13 on the US Billboard 200, selling a total of 31,417 units. The album received two Grammy award nominations for its singles "King's Dead" and "Win", in the respective categories Best Rap Song and Best Rap Performance, winning the latter.

Background
The album was announced by Top Dawg in early January 2018, after being teased for release throughout 2017. Jay Rock formally announced the album's cover art and release date on May 21, 2018.

Release and promotion
The lead single, "King's Dead" with Kendrick Lamar, Future and James Blake, was released on January 11, 2018, also serving as a single from the Black Panther soundtrack. The album version of the song includes an edited version with Future credited a guest appearance.

The second single, "Win", was released on May 16, 2018 for digital download. The third single, "The Bloodiest", was released on June 8, alongside the pre-order for the album.

A listening party was held for the album on May 29, 2018 in New York. In June 2018, a mini-documentary series entitled Road to Redemption was released with three episodes.

On November 28, 2018, the album was further supported by the single "Shit Real" alongside the music video, Redemption was then updated with this track on all streaming platforms.

Again on February 22, 2019, the album was further updated with "The Other Side".

Critical reception

Redemption was met with critical acclaim upon release. At Metacritic, which assigns a normalized rating out of 100 to reviews from mainstream publications, the album received an average score of 81 based on 10 reviews. Sheldon Pearce of Pitchfork wrote that Redemption is "about Rock getting a second chance at life, a new opportunity to show his pedigree, and about seeking a sort of absolution. The album traces his path from hood survivalist to indie darling of modest means to TDE dark horse and crash survivor, in search of even greater heights."

Chris Gibbons of XXL described Redemption as "the most cohesive of Jay Rock's albums", adding that "he puts up a career high" and "at 44 minutes, the album breezes by without many frills. Rock raps, makes his point, and gets out quickly after, allowing the TDE vet to chalk up his biggest win yet. Online hip hop publication HotNewHipHop praised Redemption for "a pretty well-rounded scope of emotions and moods, despite having no discernible thematic throughline." Kenan Draughorne of HipHopDX believed that "Redemption shines brightest when the music itself matches Rock’s dynamic performance and infuses enough energy for him to seize the moment." Clayton Purdom of The A.V. Club concluded that Redemption is "bleak but ultimately inspirational — and a spotlight on Jay’s resilience", praising Jay Rock's performance and the album's thematic presence.

Commercial performance
Redemption debuted at number 13 on the US Billboard 200 with 31,417 album-equivalent units, of which 9,290 were pure album sales. The album became Jay Rock's highest-charting album to date.

Track listing
Credits adapted from album's liner notes.

Notes
  signifies a co-producer
  signifies an additional producer
 "OSOM" features additional vocals by Sir.
 "Tap Out", "King's Dead", "Redemption", "Troopers" and "Win" feature uncredited vocals by Kendrick Lamar.
 "Win" is stylized as "WIN"

Sample credits
 "For What It's Worth" contains a sample of "Sonder Son (Interlude)", performed by Brent Faiyaz; and "Solo", performed by ORI.
 "Knock It Off" contains a sample of "Trinity's Crying", performed by CocoRosie.
 "OSOM" contains a sample of "Sailing Dreams", performed by Sieben.
 "Broke +-" contains an uncredited sample of "A Garden of Peace", written and performed by Lonnie Liston Smith.
 "Redemption" contains an interpolation of "Piece of My Love", performed by Guy.
 "Win" contains a sample of "Rooster and Runaway (from True Grit)", composed by Elmer Bernstein, as performed by the Utah Symphony orchestra.

Personnel
Credits adapted from official liner notes.

 Aron Levi – designee synth 
 Matt Schaeffer – recording , mixing 
 James Hunt – recording 
 Derek "MixedbyAli" Ali – mixing 
 Cyrus "Nois" Taghipour – mixing 
 Aria Angel Ali – mixing 
 Mike Bozzi – mastering

Charts

Weekly charts

Year-end charts

References

2018 albums
Jay Rock albums
Top Dawg Entertainment albums
Interscope Records albums
Albums produced by Boi-1da
Albums produced by Cardo
Albums produced by Cubeatz
Albums produced by Hit-Boy
Albums produced by Jake One
Albums produced by Mike Will Made It
Albums produced by Sounwave
Albums produced by Terrace Martin
Albums produced by Vinylz
Albums produced by Dave Free